The Continental Twist (also known as Twist All Night) is a 1961 film featuring the twist dance.

Plot
A group of musicians are concerned when it appears that they will be evicted from their nightclub. Musician Louis Evans and girlfriend Jenny Watson accidentally encounter a group of art thieves.

Cast
 Louis Prima as Louis Evans
 June Wilkinson as Jenny
 Gertrude Michael as Letitia
 Sam Butera as himself

References

External links

1961 films
1961 musical comedy films
Twist (dance)
American musical comedy films
American International Pictures films
1960s English-language films
1960s American films